Cryptolechia luniformis is a moth in the family Depressariidae. It was described by Wang in 2006. It is found in Guangdong, China.

The length of the forewings is 12–13 mm. The forewings are dark brown, with two black dots at the middle and the end of the cell and a broad crescent shaped whitish-yellow mark from the costal two-fifths downward to before the tornus, then upward to the costal four-fifths, tinged with light brown scales. The hindwings are grey.

Etymology
The species name refers to the shape of a marking on the forewing and is derived from Latin luniformis (meaning crescent).

References

Moths described in 2006
Cryptolechia (moth)
Taxa named by Edward Meyrick